Belper Hockey Club is a field hockey club that is based at Belper Meadows in Belper, Derbyshire. The club was founded in 1908.

The club runs eight men's teams  with the first XI playing in the Men's England Hockey League Division 1 North  and six women's teams  with the first XI playing in the Women's England Hockey League Division One North.

Notable players

Women's internationals

References

English field hockey clubs
1908 establishments in England
Sport in Derbyshire